Larutia penangensis, known as the Penang Island larut skink, is a species of skink. It is endemic to Penang Island, Malaysia.

References

penangensis
Reptiles of Malaysia
Endemic fauna of Malaysia
Reptiles described in 2011
Taxa named by Larry Lee Grismer
Taxa named by Evan Quah
Taxa named by Cameron D. Siler
Taxa named by Chan Kin Onn
Taxa named by Perry L. Wood
Taxa named by Jesse L. Grismer
Taxa named by Shahrul Anuar Mohd Sah
Taxa named by Nohrayati Ahmad